The Laythi school was an 8th-century religious law school of Fiqh within Sunni Islam whose Imam was Al-Layth ibn Sa'd. One of known characteristics of al-Layth jurisprudence was his rejection towards Maliki usage of Madina custom as an independent source of law. One of the reasons the school went extinct was because he instructed his principal student, Ammar ibn Sayf, to destroy and burn all of his works.

References 

Islamic jurisprudence
Schools of Sunni jurisprudence